Ernst Dietz (born 27 May 1943) is a German politician from the Christian Social Union of Bavaria. He was a member of the Landtag of Bavaria from 1970 to 1982.

References

1943 births
Living people
People from Tirschenreuth (district)
Members of the Landtag of Bavaria
Christian Social Union in Bavaria politicians